Leatherwood Creek may refer to:

Leatherwood Creek (St. Francis River), a stream in Missouri
Leatherwood Creek (Tawana Creek), a stream in Ohio
Leatherwood Creek (Wills Creek), a stream in Ohio
Leatherwood Creek (Virginia)

Disambiguation pages